Stainborough is a civil parish in the metropolitan borough of Barnsley, South Yorkshire, England.  The parish contains 33 listed buildings that are recorded in the National Heritage List for England.  Of these, one is listed at Grade I, the highest of the three grades, seven are at Grade II*, the middle grade, and the others are at Grade II, the lowest grade.  The parish contains the former country house, Wentworth Castle, which is listed at Grade I, its gardens and grounds, and Stainborough Park, which contain most of the buildings in the list.  These include buildings associated with the house, Home Farm and its farm buildings, monuments and a statue, a church, a bridge, and follies.  Outside these areas, the listed buildings are farmhouses, farm buildings, a public house, and a schoolroom converted into dwellings.


Key

Buildings

References

Citations

Sources

 

Lists of listed buildings in South Yorkshire
Buildings and structures in the Metropolitan Borough of Barnsley